Philopedon plagiatum, the marram weevil, is a species of broad-nosed weevil in the beetle family Curculionidae. It originates in Western Europe, with a distribution which includes Portugal, Spain, France, Ireland, Great Britain, Belgium, the Netherlands, Germany, Denmark, Norway, Sweden, Finland, Estonia, Latvia, Lithuania, Poland, Czech Republic, Slovakia, Russia, Ukraine, Hungary, Greece, Switzerland and Italy. It has been introduced into North America, first recorded in 1940. It is now established in the Maritime Region of Canada and the northeastern United States.

References

Further reading

External links

 

Entiminae
Articles created by Qbugbot
Beetles described in 1783